Kafui Danku is a Ghanaian actress and movie producer, mostly known for her role in movies such as Any Other Monday, Alvina: Thunder and Lightning, I Do, and 4Play. She is also the author of the book Silence Is Not Golden

Education
Danku attended Ola Girls School in the Volta Region of Ghana, and continued her education at the University of Cape Coast in the Central Region of Ghana.

Personal life
She is married to a Canadian man . The couple have two children, one of which was named Baby Lorde.

References 

Living people
Year of birth missing (living people)
University of Cape Coast alumni
Ghanaian actresses
OLA Girls Senior High School (Ho) alumni
People from Volta Region
Ewe people